The Alberford was an English car manufactured in about 1922 to 1924 in Albert Bridge Garage, Chelsea, London.  Marketed as "the ideal owner-driver car" it was based on a lengthened and possibly lowered chassis from a Model T Ford with wire wheels and a Rolls-Royce type radiator. The engine was converted to overhead valve and a top speed of 75 mph (120 km/h) was claimed. Prices ranged from £253 for a two-seater to £500 for a saloon.

See also 
 List of car manufacturers of the United Kingdom

References 

Vintage vehicles
Defunct motor vehicle manufacturers of England
Vehicle manufacture in London
Defunct companies based in London